is a district of Narashino City, Chiba Prefecture, Japan, consisting of 1-chōme to 6-chōme and .

Geography
The district is located on the eastern part of Narashino City.

Surrounding districts
Narashino City
 Higashi-Narashino
 Yashiki
 Moto-Okubo
 Okubo
 Shin-ei

Funabashi City
 

Hanamigawa Ward, Chiba City
 Nagasakucho
 Makuharicho

Demographics
The population as of September 2018 is shown below.

Transportation

Rail service
 Keisei Electric Railway -  Keisei Main Line
  Mimomi Station

Bus service
 Keisei Bus - Mimomi Line
 Mimomi Station - Chiba Bank - Mimomi Koban - Higashi-Narashino 2-chōme
 Narashino City Happy Bus - Keisei Ōkubo Station Route
 Tōbu Hoken-fukushi Center - Mimomi High School - Mimomi Hongo Iriguchi

Education
 Narashino City Mimomi Elementary School
 Narashino City Daini Junior High School
 Chiba Prefecture Mimomi High School

References

Chiba Prefecture
Narashino